Yu Eui-dong (Korean: 유의동, born 23 June 1971) is a South Korean conservative politician who is a Member of National Assembly for Pyeongtaek 2nd constituency since 2014.

Early career 
Prior to his political career, Yu studied Thai language at Hankuk University of Foreign Studies. He holds a master's degree in international relations from University of California, San Diego. Following the graduation, he worked as a secretary for the ex-Prime Minister Lee Han-dong, as well as an aide for a former MP Ryu Ji-young.

Political career 
Yu was elected as the MP for Pyeongtaek 2nd constituency at the 2014 by-election, after the election of Lee Jae-young was nullified. He gained 52.05% and defeated Chung Jang-sun of New Politics Alliance for Democracy.

Few months after his re-election in 2016, he left Saenuri Party (then Liberty Korea Party) and joined Bareun Party. When Yoo Seong-min was elected as the party's president in November 2017, Yu was appointed as the chief spokesperson and served till the party was merged into Bareunmirae Party.

On 18 May 2017, 10 Bareun and Liberty Korea MPs including Yu proposed an amendment, which prohibits governmental researchers to be involved in politics, in order to reinforce political neutrality. The proposed amendment includes the prohibition of endorsing any political party or its candidates.

On 15 July 2019, Yu and Paek Seung-joo, Liberty Korea MP for Gumi 1st constituency, submitted a motion to the National Assembly to dismiss the Minister of National Defence, Jeong Kyeong-doo.

On 1 December, Yu's Bareunmirae membership was suspended, as a member of the dissident group, Emergency Action for Change and Innovation. The group, later renamed as New Conservative Party, became a new political party, but was soon merged into the United Future Party (UFP; now People Power Party).

Personal life 
Yu is a son of Yu Kwang, a former Gyeonggi Provincial Assembly member who died in 2017.

References

External links 
 Yu Eui-dong on Blog
 Yu Eui-dong on Twitter
 Yu Eui-dong on YouTube

1971 births
Living people
Hankuk University of Foreign Studies alumni
University of California, San Diego alumni
People from Gyeonggi Province
Members of the National Assembly (South Korea)